Juan Carlos Barreto (born March 11, 1957, Monterrey Nuevo León, Mexico) is a Mexican actor.

Filmography

Selected film roles

Television roles

Awards and nominations

References

External links 

1957 births
Living people
Mexican male telenovela actors
Mexican male television actors
Mexican male film actors
20th-century Mexican male actors
21st-century Mexican male actors
Male actors from Monterrey